A list of notable flat horse races which take place annually in Italy, including all conditions races which currently hold Group 2 or 3 status in the European Pattern.

Group 2

Group 3

Former Group races

References
 tjcis.com – Flat races in Italy, 2012.

 Flat
Horse racing-related lists